Anil Kumar Yadav Poluboina is an Indian politician from the YSR Congress Party. He has contested as a YSR Congress Party member in 2014 and 2019 elections for Member of Legislative Assembly from Nellore City constituency and won the elections. He is a former Minister for Irrigation (Water Resources) in Andhra Pradesh.

External link

References

Living people
YSR Congress Party politicians
People from Nellore
Year of birth missing (living people)
Andhra Pradesh MLAs 2019–2024
Andhra Pradesh MLAs 2014–2019